The Emergency Committee in Aid of Displaced Foreign Scholars (1933–1945) assisted scholars who were barred from teaching, persecuted and threatened with imprisonment by the Nazis. The program began in Germany soon after Hitler took power and expanded to include Austria, Czechoslovakia, Norway, Belgium, the Netherlands, France and Italy. Prof. Philip Schwarz established this committee and sent 40 scientists to Turkey.
Over 300 scholars were assisted, some of whom became Nobel Laureates in diverse fields such as literature, medicine, and physics. The work and ideas of many of the scholars assisted by the Emergency Committee helped shape the post-war world.

The committee was first called the Emergency Committee in Aid of Displaced German Scholars, and later expanded to help other “Displaced Foreign Scholars” fleeing Nazi aggression throughout Europe. One of the early leaders of the effort was Alvin Saunders Johnson, co-founder and first director of The New School. Hundreds of European scholars were successfully relocated to America, with support from the Rockefeller Foundation and Carnegie Foundation, and generous hosting by American campuses. Johnson brought a significant number of the scholars to The New School, founding the "University in Exile" which became the Graduate Faculty of Political and Social Science.  

In 1932, at age 24 and well before he began his broadcast career, the Institute of International Education appointed Edward R. Murrow to the position of Assistant Director by its founder and Director, Stephen P. Duggan. Late in 1933, Murrow also became (without pay) the Assistant Secretary of the Committee in Aid of Displaced German Scholars. In the first two years of the Committee's existence, Murrow received requests for help from educators and researchers across Europe. His main assignment was to identify those at risk in their home countries and arrange for them to lecture and teach at U.S. colleges and universities. Murrow worked with the Emergency Committee until early 1937, overlapping the first year of his long career at CBS News. Murrow would go on to serve as a member of IIE’s Board of Trustees until his death in 1965.

The Emergency Committee would prove to be the early forerunner of IIE’s Scholar Rescue Fund, which was established in 2002.

Notable Scholars
Margarete Bieber (31 July 1879 – 25 February 1978)
Felix Bloch (October 23, 1905 – September 10, 1983)
Richard Brauer (February 10, 1901 – April 17, 1977)
Martin Buber (February 8, 1878 – June 13, 1965)
Max Delbrück (September 4, 1906 – March 9, 1981)
Johanna Gabrielle Ottilie "Tilly" Edinger (13 November 1897 – 27 May 1967) 
James Franck (26 August 1882 – 21 May 1964)
Hilda Geiringer (28 September 1893 – 22 March 1973)
Hugo Iltis (11 April 1882 - 22 June 1952)
Jacques Maritain (18 November 1882–28 April 1973)
Herbert Marcuse (July 19, 1898 – July 29, 1979)
Emmy Noether (March 23, 1882 - April 14, 1935)
Kurt Lewin (September 9, 1890 - February 12, 1947)
Otto Nathan (1893–1987)
Hans Morgenthau (February 17, 1904 – July 19, 1980)
Thomas Mann (6 June 1875 – 12 August 1955)
Fritz Reiche (Jul 4, 1883 — Jan 14, 1969)
Paul Tillich (August 20, 1886 – October 22, 1965)

Trivia

Murrow’s work with the Institute of International Education played a key role in the plot of the film Good Night, and Good Luck, produced, directed and written by George Clooney.

References

 Laura Fermi (1968) Illustrious Immigrants: The Intellectual Migration from Europe 1930–41, University of Chicago Press,  via Internet Archive

External links
Saving Lives and Ideas: A Brief History of Scholar Rescue 
IIE Scholar Rescue Fund 
Emergency Committee in Aid of Displaced Foreign Scholars records, Manuscripts and Archives Division, New York Public Library 

Holocaust charities and reparations